Mohamed Aboussalam  (born 20 August 1996) is a French-Moroccan basketball player who plays for Cambrai Basket and .

Professional career
Aboussalam played for the youth teams of Rouen, before joining the LNB Pro B team in 2016. In 2018, he signed his first professional contract when he signed with MAS Fes of the Division Excellence.

National team career
Aboussalam represented Morocco's national basketball team at the 2017 AfroBasket in Tunisia and Senegal.

References

External links
 FIBA profile
 Real GM profile
 Afrobasket.com profile

1996 births
Living people
Centers (basketball)
Moroccan men's basketball players
Moroccan expatriates in France
Moroccan people of French descent